The Dubai Philharmonic Orchestra (DPO) was founded in 2006 by Philipp Maier (who became its first conductor and artistic director) to fulfill the need for an orchestra within the United Arab Emirates. It performs in the city of Dubai.

In 2007, the orchestra was renamed the UAE Philharmonic Orchestra (UAEPO) due to its wide recognition and participation of musicians from all around the United Arab Emirates. The UAEPO is currently the only permanent orchestra in the UAE.

Originally called the Dubai Philharmonia,  the UAEPO consists of around 70 volunteer amateur and professional musicians resident in the UAE, and performs regularly at private events, public concerts and corporate functions.

Performances in early 2007 were claimed to be well-attended and successful.

The UAE Philharmonic Orchestra performs both European classical music and specially commissioned works influenced by both European and Arabic musical traditions.

Philipp Maier resigned September 2012.

See also
 List of symphony orchestras

References

External links
UAEPO official website

Emirati orchestras
Culture in Dubai